Thika High School is a boys-only boarding high school located in Thika District in Central Province, Kenya. Thika High School was founded in 1951, while Kenya was still a British Colony, by the Alliance of Protestant Churches and the Church of Scotland Mission (later known as the Presbyterian Church of East Africa or PCEA). It was originally set at the site of the current Thogoto Teachers College, but due to its proximity to another PCEA boys' school, Alliance Boys' High School, it was moved to Thika. The school is known for its academic and sports excellence from its foundation to the mid-1950s.

Curriculum 
Thika High School offers a college preparatory program following the Kenya Certificate of Secondary Education curriculum. The curriculum offered at the school consists of: Mathematics, Biology, Physics, Chemistry, English, Geography, Aviation, History and Government, Christian Religious Education (C.R.E.), Kiswahili, Computer Studies, Agriculture, Physics, Art and Design, Electricity, French, Music, German, and Commerce (offered as Business Studies).

Notable alumni
Notable figures include
 Jackton Boma Ojwang, associate justice of the Supreme Court of Kenya
 Irungu Kang'ata (Senator, Murang'a County)
 Paul Muite (Former Member or Parliament, Kikuyu Constituency)
 Linus Gitahi (Former CEO, Nation Media Group)
 Dr. F. George Njoroge (Former Director and Discoverer of Victrelis, HCV Drug,  Merck and Eli Lilly)

References
Dr. Nduati, MB.ChB.

External links
Satellite Picture of Thika School
Thika High School

Educational institutions established in 1951
Boarding schools in Kenya
Education in Central Province (Kenya)
1951 establishments in the British Empire